The Summer Carnival is the upcoming eighth concert tour by American singer Pink. The tour is scheduled to begin on June 7, 2023, at the University of Bolton Stadium in Bolton, England. It is in support of her upcoming ninth studio album Trustfall (2023). The tour includes appearances at three major European music festivals: Pinkpop Festival, Werchter Boutique and BST Hyde Park.

Background
In October 2022, Pink announced her stadium tour in the UK and Europe, which includes festivals such as BST Hyde Park, Werchter Boutique and Pinkpop Festival. On November 14, 2022, Pink announced North American dates for the tour. On February 8, 2023, The Edge announced two New Zealand shows. seven dates in Australia were announced the next day. On March 5, 2023, two additional dates in Australia were announced in Melbourne and Sydney.

In her cover story of Women's Health magazine, she said that she is "kind of like a circus act" and they are "always on the lookout for new cool things that you might not die from."

Shows

Notes

References

2023 concert tours
Concert tours of Europe
Concert tours of Germany
Concert tours of France 
Concert tours of North America
Concert tours of the United Kingdom
Pink (singer) concert tours
Upcoming concert tours
2024 concert tours
Concert tours of New Zealand